Poe Boy Music Group (formerly Poe Boy Entertainment) is an American record label, founded in 1999 by Elric "E-Class" Prince, the label's founder and CEO. President of Poe Boy Music Group Elvin "Big Chuck" Prince, CEO of Hiram Music Group & CEO of 24hourhiphop.com. That same year the label signed local Miami rappers, Cognito, The P.O.D, Brisco and singer Rodney Kohn who set the label in motion. Poe Boy Music Group signed acts such as Flo Rida, J Rand, Kulture Shock, Billy Blue, Jacki-O, Brisco, Rick Ross, and Brianna Perry.

The label has a close affiliation with fellow Miami based label Slip-n-Slide Records.

Artists

Current roster
Flo Rida (Poe Boy/IMG/Strongarm/Atlantic)
J Rand (Formerly knowns as J Randall) (Poe Boy/Geffen)
Brisco (Cash Money/Universal Motown)
Rodney Kohn (IMG/Strongarm)
Brianna Perry (Poe Boy/Atlantic Records)
Billy Blue (Poe Boy/Konvict/Mosley/Interscope)
Kulture Shock (consisting of City, Jase and Stephie Lecor) (Poe Boy/Hiram Group)
DJ Smokey Bear (Poe Boy/Hiram Group)
YT Triz
King leonidas  (Poe Boy/ Hiram Group)

Producers
JRock
Flyntstones

Comedians
Benji Brown

Past releases
The P.O.D – The Power Of Dollars
Released: October 1, 2001
Chart positions:
RIAA certification:

Cognito – Tru Cognizance
Released: November 5, 2002
Chart positions:
RIAA certification:
Singles: "Addicted To Ya", "Big Bank"
Jacki-O – Poe Little Rich Girl
Released: October 26, 2004
Chart positions: No. 95 Billboard
RIAA certification:
Singles: "Nookie (Real Good)", "Fine", "Sugar Walls", "Break You Off"

Rick Ross – Trilla
Released: March 11, 2008
Chart positions: No. 1 Billboard
RIAA certification: Gold
U.S. sales: 700,000+
Singles: "Speedin'", "The Boss", "Here I Am", "This Is the Life"

Flo Rida – Mail on Sunday
Released: March 18, 2008
Chart positions: No. 4 Billboard
RIAA certification:
U.S. sales: 350,000+
Singles: "Low", "Elevator", "In the Ayer"

Billy Blue – Rated Hood - The Street Album (Mixtape)
Released: 2008
Chart positions:
RIAA certification:
Singles: "Ball Like A Dog", "Get Like Me"

Flo Rida – R.O.O.T.S.
Released: March 31, 2009
Chart Positions: No. 8 Billboard
RIAA certification:
Singles: "Right Round", "Shone", "Sugar"

Rick Ross – Deeper Than Rap
Released: April 21, 2009
Chart Positions: No. 1 Billboard
RIAA certification:
Singles: "Magnificent", "Usual Suspects"

Flo Rida - Only One Flo (Part 1)
Released: November 30, 2010
Chart Positions: No. 107 Billboard
RIAA certification:
Singles: "Club Can't Handle Me", "Turn Around (5, 4, 3, 2, 1)", "Who Dat Girl"

Flo Rida - Wild Ones
Released: July 3, 2012
Chart Positions: No. 14 Billboard
RIAA certification:
Singles: "Good Feeling", "Wild Ones", "Whistle" "I Cry"

Upcoming releases
Brisco – Street MedicineBilly Blue – The Story Of My LifeBrianna Perry – Girl Talk''

External links
New Official Website

Record labels established in 1999
American record labels
Hip hop record labels
Warner Music labels
Atlantic Records